Kumzits (קומזיץ) is used to describe a musical gathering that Jews partake in. Everyone sits together, be it on the floor or on chairs, and sings spiritually moving songs. In order to establish a certain ambiance the lighting is often low and candles are primarily used, or if taking place outdoors it is usually around a campfire.

If it is not the Jewish Sabbath then there will usually be musical instruments, such as guitar or violin. An orator will usually tell short inspirational folk-stories between songs.

Among Slonimer Chassidim, a similar gathering is called a "zitzen", which is Yiddish for “sitting”, is conducted by the Chassidim after the Rebbe’s Tish, without the presence of the Rebbe.

It is a compound word in Yiddish composed of קום (come) and זיץ (sit). Originally the word was coined by the Biluim. Despite the opposition of some who preferred to use the more distinctly Hebrew שב-נא Shev-na "please sit" or Persian/Arabic טוזיג “Tozig” (via the Talmud), the word has stuck and is used mainly by the religious but sometimes also the secular public.

Times 

Often, a kumzits will take place after the Sabbath, and as such some erroneously use the term interchangeably with Melava Malka. When a kumzits takes place Friday night, it is often called an "oneg shabbos" (a Hebrew phrase meaning "Sabbath pleasure"). Kumzits are also popular among campers.

Songs 

Generally, slow, moving songs are sung during a kumzitz. Songs composed by Shlomo Carlebach are very popular, as well as songs by the more recent Jewish singing groups such as Dveykus and Zusha. If the kumzits takes place on the Jewish Sabbath, songs with a Sabbath theme can be sung. If the kumzits is held on Rosh Chodesh or near the date of another Jewish holiday, songs associated with that holiday can be sung. Here is a partial list of the more popular kumzits songs:
Rachem Buchasdecho (MBD)
Kad Yasvun Yisroel
V'atah Bunim Shiru Lamelech (Yeedle)
Achas Sha'alti Mei'eis Ha-shem
Shifchi Kamayim Leebeich (Carlebach)
"Gut (Dudi Knopfler)
Na'ar Hayeesee Gam Zakanti
Ani Ma'amin Be'emuna Sh'leima...Bevias Hamashiach
Lashem Haaretz (Yitzchak Fuchs)
Al Tira Ki Ya'ashir Ish
Al Tira Mipachad Pis'om
Vuatem Hadvekim...(Baruch Chait)
Chamol...(Yigal Calek)
Rachem B'chasdecha Al Amcha Tzureinu
Acheinu Kol Beis Yisroel (Abie Rotenberg & Doody Rosenberg)
Hamalach...(Doody Rosenberg)
Eelan Bama Avarechicha(Abie Rotenberg)
Kol Haolam Kulo Gesher Tzar Me'od
Tov Lehodos Lashem
Vezakeini Legadel (Boruch Levine)
Mee Ha'ish Hachafetz Chaim (Baruch Chait)
Bilvavi Mishkan Evneh
L'ma'an Achai V'rei'ai (Carlebach, popularized in English as Because of My Brothers and Friends)
Unuh Hashem Kee Anee Avd'chu
L'mikdashech Tuv
Pischu Li Sha'arei Tzedek (Carlebach)
Barcheinu Aveenu Kulanu K'echad (Carlebach)
Gam Kee Eileich B'gei Tzalmaves
Yehee Shalom B'cheileich
In A Vinkeleh Shteit(Abie Rotenberg)
Lulei Sorascha Sha'ashu'ai (Carlebach)
Eliyahu Hananavee (Carlebach)
Hadran (Hillel Kapnick)
Im Eshkacheich Yerushalayim(Carlebach)
Tov L'Eodoth(Yaakov Shwekey)
Oid Yaishvu (MBD)

References

Yiddish words and phrases
Meetings